Men's Downhill World Cup 1985/1986

Calendar

Final point standings 

References

External links
 

World Cup
FIS Alpine Ski World Cup men's downhill discipline titles